Yuliya Polishchuk is a London-based fashion designer who was born in Ukraine.

Career
Polishchuk launched MissU in 2012. 'Very often women are hiding the real "I" and are afraid to let the world know about it. I'm trying to create things with a real identity and elegance', the designer explained during an interview.

Following this slogan, in March 2013 Yuliya Polishchuk has presented a new line of evening dresses under her own name, which has been recognized by the audience and fashion critics in Ukraine. A woman from Yuliya Polishchuk is sophisticated and elegant. Since March 2012, Polishchuk is a resident of the Ukrainian Fashion Week in Kyiv. At the moment her portfolio includes two different fashion labels. The MissU trademark has been developed specifically for young women: they are mischievous and thoughtful, careless and serious but at the same time both feminine and romantic. Whereas, Yuliya Polishchuk brand is dedicated to confident and successful women whose unique and charming style are enhanced by elegant and exclusive evening dresses.

Yuliya's work was presented for the first time in February 2009, during Sunrise in Baku Fashion Project. The fashion project was broadcast for a month on Fashion TV (Europe, America and Middle East), BBC Azeri, and MTV, and Yuliya's work attracted much of the spotlight during the show.

Other activities
Yuliya Polishchuk actively supports education and student programs in the fashion industry, and regularly delivers lectures at universities in London and Kyiv. Recently, the designer initiated Fashion Move On, a unique art project that she run in partnership with the Ukrainian Fashion Week. The project was created to support and develop collaborations between designers, filmmakers and contemporary artists. The collaboration occurred in the form of short films that were officially presented to the press and public during the Ukrainian Fashion Week.

References

1983 births
Living people
21st-century Ukrainian women artists
Businesspeople from Kyiv
Ukrainian designers
Ukrainian fashion designers
Ukrainian women fashion designers